Vladislav Titelbah (1847–1925) was a Czech-born Serbian painter. In his aquarelles and drawings, he depicted rural interiors, persons, and scenes. He also copied Serbian folk embroidery and other products of folk art from Serbia. He made around 1,000 works.

References

Sources

 

1847 births
1925 deaths
19th-century Serbian painters
Serbian male painters
20th-century Serbian painters
Serbian people of Czech descent
Immigrants to the Principality of Serbia
Austro-Hungarian emigrants to Serbia
19th-century Serbian male artists
20th-century Serbian male artists